Three Oaks Senior High School (often abbreviated as TOSH) is a Canadian secondary school located in Summerside, Prince Edward Island for students from the eastern part of Prince County, including the City of Summerside.

The school is administratively part of the Public Schools Branch. Its official colours are Green and Gold and the mascot is an Axeman. The sports teams from TOSH are called the Three Oaks Axemen.

History and characteristics
The school opened in 1976 to replace the Summerside High School on Central Street. This building eventually became Summerside Intermediate School.

School sports

Sports at Three Oaks Today
TOSH is home to many extracurricular sporting events that are offered throughout students' three years of high school. There is one Field Hockey field, one Softball field, and three Soccer/Rugby fields.

Sports at Three Oaks Senior High Include:

boys and girls Basketball
boys and girls Wrestling
boys and girls Rugby
boys and girls Cross Country
boys and girls Soccer
boys and girls Softball
boys and girls Track & Field
boys and girls golf
boys and girls Badminton
boys and girls Volleyball
boys and girls Powerlifting
boys Football
girls Field Hockey

Sports tournaments

The Christmas Classic
A Women's and men's basketball tournament hosted in early December by Three Oaks Senior High School which draws schools competing from across P.E.I., New Brunswick and Nova Scotia. Six women's basketball teams and eight men's basketball teams from schools across the Maritimes take part in the annual basketball tournament.

The annual teams are the Three Oaks Axemen, the Charlottetown Rural Raiders, the Colonel Gray Colonels, the Bluefield Bobcats, the Lockview Dragons, the Millwood Knights, the Sussex Sonics, the Miramichi Golden Eagles, the Dalhousie Vultures and the Amherst Vikings.

The Winter Classic
A Men's basketball tournament hosted in early January by Three Oaks Senior High School which draws schools competing from across the three Prince Edward Island County which are: Kings County, Queens County, and Prince County. A total of six men's basketball teams from schools across the province take part in the annual basketball tournament.

The annual teams are the Three Oaks Axemen, the Charlottetown Rural Raiders, the Kensington Torchmen, the Westisle Wolverines the Montague Vikings and the Colonel Gray Colonels.

David Voye Memorial Rugby Tournament
A Women's and men's rugby tournament hosted in early May by Three Oaks Senior High School which draws schools competing from across P.E.I., New Brunswick and Nova Scotia.

The annual teams are the Three Oaks Axemen, the Charlottetown Rural Raiders, the Bluefield Bobcats, the Westisle Wolverines, the North Nova Gryphons, the Cobequid Cougar, the Montague Vikings, the Colonel Gray Colonels, the Avonview Avalanche, the Horton Griffin and the Northumberland Nighthawks.

Clubs at Three Oaks
TOSH is home to a variety of clubs, including:
Yearbook Committee
Grad Activity Committee
Prom Committee
Reach for the Top
Rotary Youth Parliament
SADD
We to Me
Student Council
Music Council Executive
R&B (Rhythm and Blues) Band
Eco-ethics
Envirothon
Minions
Leadership
Smash Club

Notable graduates 
 Heather Moyse, 2 time Olympic gold medalist
 Walter Moyse, basketball player
 Adam Casey Curler
Anson Carmody Curler

See also
List of schools in Prince Edward Island
List of school districts in Prince Edward Island

References 

High schools in Prince Edward Island
Buildings and structures in Summerside, Prince Edward Island
Educational institutions established in 1976
1976 establishments in Prince Edward Island
Schools in Prince County, Prince Edward Island